Tian mo (甜沫) is a traditional breakfast soup from the city of Jinan in the Shandong province of China. The soup is made of millet powder, peanuts, vermicelli, cowpea, spiced tofu (or shredded tofu skin), and spinach. The soup has a thick texture once cooked and has a salty taste. It is normally eaten with Youtiao.

See also
 Douzhi
 List of Chinese soups
 List of soups

References

External links
 How to make Tian mo

Chinese soups